Bonea is a comune (municipality) in the Province of Benevento in the Italian region Campania, located about 40 km northeast of Naples and about 15 km southwest of Benevento.

Bonea borders the following municipalities: Airola, Bucciano, Montesarchio, Rotondi, Tocco Caudio.

References

External links
Official website

Cities and towns in Campania